Beauty and the Beast is a 1934 Warner Bros. Merrie Melodies animated short film, directed by Friz Freleng. The short was released on April 14, 1934.

Except for its title and the inclusion of a "beastly" character, the film has nothing in common with the fairy tale of the same name.

Plot summary
As the clock strikes ten, a young girl sneaks out of her nursery for a late-night snack of fruit and chocolate—which may be the cause of the strange dream that follows.  On her return to the nursery, the Sandman comes to life from the nursery mural, and sends her in a dream to Toyland, inhabited by fairyland characters.  A trio of identical heralds sing her a welcome song, but also warn her of the Beast she must avoid, lest he eat her.

The girl witnesses a toy parade and is smitten with a toy soldier ("Ain't he cute?").  The soldier takes her to Fairytale Land, where they open a huge book titled "Beauty and the Beast" and, reading the text, sing a song about a girl menaced by a monster.  When they turn the page, the huge, shaggy, half-human Beast leaps out of the book and seizes the girl.  The toy soldier sends a toy airplane to attack the Beast, and tries to fire a cannon at him, but these tactics prove ineffective.

Just as it appears that the girl is doomed, she awakes on the floor of her nursery.  She leaps into her crib and cowers under the covers as the flap of her pajamas falls open, revealing her bare buttocks, and the film ends.

Production
By early 1934, Friz Freleng was appointed the main director of the Merrie Melodies, following the departures of other directors from Leon Schlesinger Productions (the company later known as Warner Bros. Cartoons). Beauty and the Beast (released in April 1934) was the first Merrie Melodies animated short film directed by Freleng. It was a color film, using a two-color process. However, following its release, Freleng would direct six short films in black and white. Among them were The Girl at the Ironing Board and The Miller's Daughter. From November 1934 onwards, the Merrie Melodies switched to only including color films. The sibling series Looney Tunes continued to be produced in black and white.

Animation historian Michael Barrier reports that other than the use of color, there is little to set Beauty and the Beast apart from a typical Merrie Melodies film, as directed by Rudy Ising. Freleng as a director was extending and revising formulas established by Ising. Part of the strong resemblance was unsurprising. Freleng himself had drawn the character layouts for most of Ising's Merrie Melodies. But there were also other similarities; down to the details. For example, the little girl of the film exclaims "Ain't he cute?". This phrase was used as a catchphrase in Harman and Ising films.

The plot of the film follows a formula that had been previously used in Ising's Merrie Melodies and in early Silly Symphonies.  The films of this type opened with characters dancing and singing, then these activities were interrupted by the actions of a villain. The defeat of the villain required the combined efforts of the dancers and singers. Freleng would follow this formula in several of his subsequent Merrie Melodies.

References

Sources

External links
 

1934 films
1934 animated films
1934 comedy films
American black-and-white films
Cinecolor films
Films scored by Norman Spencer (composer)
Films about dreams
Fictional couples
Sandman in film
Short films directed by Friz Freleng
Films set in a fictional country
Merrie Melodies short films
Warner Bros. Cartoons animated short films
Films about sentient toys
1930s Warner Bros. animated short films